Cuetzala del Progreso  is a city and the seat of the municipality of Cuetzala del Progreso, in the state of Guerrero, south-western Mexico.

References

Populated places in Guerrero